Maria Marc, née  Bertha Pauline Marie Franck (12 June 1876 - 25 January 1955), was a German artist. She is also known as the wife of the painter Franz Marc.

Biography 
She was born on 12 June 1876 in Berlin, Germany. She attended the Unterrichtanstalt des Kunstgewerbemuseum, the Königliche Akademie der Künste (Royal Academy of Arts,Berlin), and the Damen-Akademie des Künstlerinnen-Vereins (Ladies Academy of the Artists' Association, Munich). She met the artist Franz Marc in 1905, marrying him in 1913. Her work was included in the first exhibition of the Blauer Reiter group. After Franz Marc's death she studied textile art at the Bauhaus.

Maria Marc died on 25 January 1955 in Ried, Bavaria. Her work is in MoMA's German Expressionist collection.

References

External links
images of Marc's work in MoMA's German Expressionist collection

1876 births
1955 deaths
Artists from Berlin
20th-century German women artists
Franz Marc